Andrea Sottil (born 4 January 1974) is an Italian football coach and former footballer, who played as a defender, currently in charge of Udinese.

Player career
Sottil started his career with Torino and made his Serie A debut on 6 December 1992, in a 1–1 draw to Foggia. In 1994, he left Torino to join Fiorentina, then moving to Atalanta later in 1996. In 1999, he moved to Udinese, where he also had the opportunity to play at continental level in the UEFA Cup.

Sottil was signed by Reggina in co-ownership deal in summer 2003, along with teammate Gonzalo Martínez. In summer 2005, he was signed by Catania, which he was the regular starter in the first two-season, but only played 7 games in 2007–08 Serie A.

In August 2008, he was signed by Rimini. In July 2009 he left for Alessandria. He retired at the end of the 2010–11 season, having managed over 200 games in Serie A throughout his career.

Coach
Soon after retirement, Sottil passed the category 2 (UEFA A) coaching exam in June 2011. Later in the summer he was appointed new head coach of Lega Pro Prima Divisione club U.S. Siracusa, with the goal of leading the ambitious Sicilians into the battle to promotion in the Serie B league.

In 2012, he was the coach of Gubbio in Lega Pro Prima Divisione. In 2013, he is the coach of A.C. Cuneo in Lega Pro Seconda Divisione. He was fired on 7 January 2014. Ezio Rossi replaced Sottil on the next day.

In 2015 Sottil returned to Siracusa for A.S.D. Città di Siracusa. The club was promoted to Lega Pro as Siracusa Calcio. He left the club in the summer 2017.

He was re-hired by Livorno on 8 April 2018 after getting fired earlier in the same season.

On 5 July 2018, he was appointed new coach of Catania. He was fired from Catania on 2 July 2019.

On 7 July 2020, he took his first Serie B managerial role, being named Nicola Legrottaglie's successor at the helm of Pescara in a last-ditch attempt to save the club from relegation. He guided Pescara to safety after defeating Perugia on penalties in a two-legged playoff, but was not confirmed for the next season.

On 23 December 2020, he took over as the new head coach of relegation-threatened Serie B side Ascoli, becoming the third manager of the season for the Bianconeri. After guiding Ascoli for two seasons, and reaching the promotion playoffs in his final one in charge of the club, on 6 June 2022 Sottil left the Picchio by mutual consent. The following day, he was announced as the new head coach of Serie A club Udinese.

Personal life
His son Riccardo Sottil made his Serie A debut for Fiorentina in the 2018–19 season.

Managerial statistics

Honours
Fiorentina
Coppa Italia: 1995–96

Udinese
UEFA Intertoto Cup: 2000

Individual
Serie A Coach of the Month: September 2022

References

External links
http://aic.football.it/scheda/353/sottil-andrea.htm
http://www.gazzetta.it/speciali/statistiche/2008_nw/giocatori/1025.shtml
http://www.gazzetta.it/Speciali/serie_a_2007/giocatori/sottil_and.shtml
FIGC

1974 births
Living people
People from Venaria Reale
Italian footballers
Italian football managers
Italy under-21 international footballers
Italy youth international footballers
Torino F.C. players
ACF Fiorentina players
Atalanta B.C. players
Udinese Calcio players
Reggina 1914 players
Genoa C.F.C. players
Catania S.S.D. players
Rimini F.C. 1912 players
U.S. Alessandria Calcio 1912 players
Serie A players
Serie B players
Association football defenders
Catania S.S.D. managers
A.S. Gubbio 1910 managers
U.S. Siracusa managers
U.S. Livorno 1915 managers
Delfino Pescara 1936 managers
Ascoli Calcio 1898 F.C. managers
Udinese Calcio managers
Serie B managers
Serie C managers
Serie D managers
Footballers from Piedmont
Sportspeople from the Metropolitan City of Turin